Cassinia leptocephala is a species of flowering plant in the family Asteraceae and is endemic to New South Wales. It is a large, woody shrub with hairy, reddish stems, stiff linear leaves, and heads of pale yellow flowers arranged in a dense corymb.

Description
The base of the leaves is stem-clasping and the lower surface is scaly and covered with glandular hairs.

Taxonomy and naming
Cassinia leptocephala was first formally described in 1863 by Ferdinand von Mueller in Fragmenta phytographiae Australiae.

In 2004, Anthony Edward Orchard described two subspecies in Australian Systematic Botany, and the names are accepted by the Australian Plant Census:
 Cassinia leptocephala subsp. everettiae Orchard has woolly involucral bracts;
 Cassinia leptocephala Orchard subsp. leptocephala has more or less glabrous bracts.

Distribution and habitat
This cassinia grows in forest, from the Sydney region to the New England National Park and west to the Warrumbungle Range in New South Wales. Subspecies everettiae is restricted to the Warrumbungle Range.

References

leptocephala
Asterales of Australia
Flora of New South Wales
Taxa named by Ferdinand von Mueller
Plants described in 1863